A Village Romeo and Juliet is an opera by Frederick Delius, the fourth of his six operas. The composer himself, with his wife Jelka, wrote the English-language libretto based on the short story "Romeo und Julia auf dem Dorfe" by the Swiss author Gottfried Keller. The first performance was at the Komische Oper Berlin on 21 February 1907, as Romeo und Julia auf dem Dorfe. Thomas Beecham conducted the British premiere at the Royal Opera House, Covent Garden in London on 22 February 1910. The US premiere was on 26 April 1972 in Washington, D.C.

The New York City Opera (NYCO) staged the work in 1973 for the opera's New York City premiere with Richard T. Gill as Marti, June Angela as the child Vreli, Patricia Wells as the adult Vreli, John Stewart as Sali, David Holloway as the Dark Fiddler, and Thomas Jamerson as the Three Barge Men. In his review of the NYCO production, music critic Allen Hughes wrote, "This piece has had few productions in the 72 years of its existence, and the reasons for that are not hard to find. To begin, it is, essentially, two hours of mood music for orchestra with secondary parts for singers, and the orchestra envisioned by Delius was so vast as to be impractical for conventional opera presentation. Furthermore, the staging implications were such that they could not be realized adequately in a theater depending upon physical sets and for effects." 

While the opera has rarely been staged, the orchestral interlude between Scenes 5 and 6, "The Walk to the Paradise Garden", is heard separately in concerts and has been recorded many times.

Roles

The premiere of the English version featured Walter Hyde as Sali; Ruth Vincent as Vrenchen (Vreli); Robert Maitland as the Black Fiddler (sic); Harry Dearth as Manz; Dillon Shallard as Marti; Muriel Terry as the young Sali and the Wild Girl; Betty Booker as the young Vrenchen and the Slim Girl; Arthur Royd as the Poor Horn Player; and Albert Archdeacon as the Hunchback Bass Player.

Synopsis
The opera is in six scenes.

At the beginning of the opera, Sali, son of the farmer Manz, and Vrenchen (Vreli), daughter of the farmer Marti, are children. They are playing together one September morning on a plot of land. The Dark Fiddler is the rightful owner of this disputed land, but because he is illegitimate and thus without legal rights, he cannot exert control over the land. He appears to the children and warns them that the land must not be tilled. Manz and Marti dispute ownership of the land, and put a stop to the relationship between their respective children.

Six years later, at Marti's now run-down house, Sali and Vrenchen plan a meeting. Since their childhood, a lawsuit about the land has ruined both Manz and Marti. Sali persuades Vrenchen to meet him on the plot. The Dark Fiddler re-appears once more and invites them to join him. He also tells them that, regardless, they will meet again. Marti sees the two lovers and takes Vreli away. In trying to stop Marti, Sali injures him severely. As a result, Marti loses his reason and must be confined in an asylum. Sali returns and sees Vreli at her house, which is to be sold. The two declare their love and decide to leave together.

At a local fair, Sali and Vreli buy rings. Sali mentions an inn, the Paradise Garden, where they can dance all night, and they go there. The Dark Fiddler and some vagrants are drinking there. He greets the lovers, and suggests they join him to share a vagabond life in the mountains. Instead, Sali and Vreli decide that they cannot live such an existence, and they resolve to die together, uncompromising in their love for each other. They leave the inn and find a hay barge, which they release from the dock to begin to float down the river. As the Dark Fiddler observes them, Sali removes the plug from the bottom of the boat, and Sali and Vreli sink with the boat.

Recordings

References

Notes

Sources

Holden, Amanda (Ed.), The New Penguin Opera Guide, New York: Penguin Putnam, 2001.

External links
 A Village Romeo and Juliet at Boosey & Hawkes
 A Village Romeo and Juliet A concise scene-by-scene synopsis is included in this PDF file, provided by the Naxos/Chandos label, of the booklet that accompanies their all-Delius 2-CD set (Naxos catalog item 8.110982-83) that includes the 1948 performance of this opera; all the tracks are  conducted by Sir Thomas Beecham, recorded from 1946 through 1952.

Operas by Frederick Delius
English-language operas
Operas
1907 operas
Operas set in Switzerland
Operas based on literature
Adaptations of works by Gottfried Keller